The 2010 season was Gwangju Sangmu FC's ninth season in the K-League in South Korea. Gwangju Sangmu FC will be competing in the K-League, League Cup and Korean FA Cup.

Current squad

K-League

Korean FA Cup

League Cup

Group stage

Squad statistics

Appearances and goals
Statistics accurate as of match played 7 November 2010

Top scorers

Discipline

Transfer

In

Out

References

 Gwangju Sangmu FC website 

Gwangju Sangmu
2010